is a Japanese football player who currently plays for AC Nagano Parceiro.

Career

He led the Japan Football League in scoring for the 2009 season. Shiozawa previously played for Mito Hollyhock in the J. League Division 2.

Club career statistics
Updated to 23 February 2016.

References

External links

 Profile at AC Nagano Parceiro

1982 births
Living people
Yamagata University alumni
Association football people from Nagano Prefecture
Japanese footballers
J1 League players
J2 League players
J3 League players
Japan Football League players
Mito HollyHock players
SP Kyoto FC players
Matsumoto Yamaga FC players
AC Nagano Parceiro players
Association football forwards